"Ready to Go" is a song by English musical duo Hurts from their fourth studio album, Desire (2017). It was released on 1 September 2017 as the second single from the album. An accompanying music video premiered on the same day.

Background and release
The song was officially announced on 29 August 2017 through a post on the duo's official Facebook page containing the artwork cover for the single and the release date. Two days later, on 1 September, the song was released as a pre-order track on iTunes and was also made available as a single on several streaming services, including Spotify.

Composition and lyrical interpretation
"Ready to Go" was written by Theo Hutchcraft, Adam Anderson and Scottish singer-songwriter David Sneddon. According to Theo himself, "the song is about living life to the fullest". He also described it as being the "lighter side" of the duo's songwriting, calling it a "standalone moment" from their upcoming album Desire.

Music video
The music video for the song was directed by Thomas James. It was shot in two days at Horwich in Bolton, Greater Manchester. The video required 26 cast members, one horse, three locations, one caravan, 30 live butterflies and several stunts. It premiered on 1 September 2017. In the video, Hutchcraft plays a grieving man who breaks into dance at his lover's funeral, portrayed by French-English actress Poppy Corby-Tuech. The dance routine was choreographed by Alexandra Green.

Hutchcraft says the video "tells a story of passion, grief and the internal struggle that a lot of men face when dealing with their emotions in public", something that it's a common issue in the North of England, where the video was filmed.

Credits and personnel
Credits adapted from Tidal.

 Theo Hutchcraft – songwriting, production, vocals
 Adam Anderson – songwriting, production
 David Sneddon – songwriting
 Lael Goldberg - additional production
 Joe Kearns – engineering
 Matty Green – mixing engineering

Charts

Release history

References

2017 singles
2017 songs
Hurts songs
Songs written by David Sneddon
Sony Music singles
Songs written by Theo Hutchcraft